Hell Yeah or Hell Yeah! may refer to:

Music
 Hellyeah, a heavy metal band

Albums
 Hell Yeah! album by Rene SG
 Hell Yeah! The Awesome Foursome, a 2008 live album by Gamma Ray
 Hellyeah (album)
 Hell Yeah! (Black 'n Blue album), 2011
 Hell Yeah! (HorrorPops album), 2004
 Hell Yeah (KMFDM album), 2017

Songs
 "Hell Yeah" (Montgomery Gentry song), a 2003 song
 "Hell Yeah" (Rev Theory song), a 2008 song
 "Hell Yeah", a 2002 song by Ginuwine
 "Hell Yeah!", a 2005 song by American Hi-Fi from the album Hearts on Parade
 "Hell Yeah" (Midnight Red song), a 2012 song
 "Hell Yeah", a 2012 song by Nicki Minaj from the album Pink Friday: Roman Reloaded – The Re-Up
 "Hell, Yeah", song by Nothing But Thieves from the album Broken Machine
 "Hell Yeah (Pimp the System)" track on RBG: Revolutionary but Gangsta by  Dead Prez
 "Hell Yeah" (Rock Remix) another track on RBG: Revolutionary but Gangsta

Other
 "Hell Yeah! Wrath of the Dead Rabbit", a video game